The 2007–08 Denver Nuggets season was the 41st season of the franchise, 32nd in the National Basketball Association (NBA). The season saw Allen Iverson play his only full season as a Nugget until he was traded to Detroit midway through the next year. Despite winning 50 games, the Nuggets entered the playoffs as the number 8 seed in the Western Conference. They failed to make it out of the first round once again as they were swept by the eventual Western Conference Champion Los Angeles Lakers, led by league MVP Kobe Bryant, in four straight games. The Nuggets had the ninth best team offensive rating in the NBA.

Offseason

Draft picks
Denver did not have any draft picks.

Roster

Regular season

Season standings

Record vs. opponents

Game log

October 
Record: 1–0; Home: 1–0; Road: 0–0

November 
Record: 9–7; Home: 6–2; Road: 3–5

December 
Record: 8–5; Home: 5–3; Road: 3–2

January 
Record: 9–6; Home: 7–0; Road: 2–6

February 
Record: 8–5; Home: 4–2; Road: 4–3

March 
Record: 10–6; Home: 7–0; Road: 3–6

April 
Record: 5–3; Home: 3–1; Road: 2–2

 Green background indicates win.
 Red background indicates loss.

Playoffs

|-bgcolor="#edbebf"
| 1 || April 20 || @ L.A. Lakers || 114–128 || Anthony, Iverson (30) || Anthony (12) || Iverson (7)||Staples Center18,997 || 0–1
|-bgcolor="#edbebf"
| 2 || April 23 || @ L.A. Lakers || 107–122 || Iverson (31) || Camby (17) || Iverson (6) ||Staples Center18,997 || 0–2
|-bgcolor="#edbebf"
| 3 || April 26 || L.A. Lakers || 84–108 || Anthony (16) || Camby (12) || Camby (4) ||Pepsi Center19,602 || 0–3
|-bgcolor="#edbebf"
| 4 || April 28 || L.A. Lakers || 101–107 || Smith (26) || Camby (17) || Carter (6) ||Pepsi Center19,264 || 0–4
|-

Player stats

Regular season

Playoffs

Awards and records

Awards
 Marcus Camby, NBA All-Defensive First Team

Records

Milestones

Transactions

Trades

Free agents

Additions

Subtractions

See also
 2007–08 NBA season

References

External links

Denver Nuggets seasons
Denver Nuggets
Denver Nuggets
2007–08 NBA season by team